The Indravati River in Nepal is a tributary of the Sun Koshi River. It used to be called "Melamchi" or
"Melamchu" until the 19th century.

Course
The source of the Indravati River is located in the south-facing slopes of the Himalayas. Its upper course is characterized by a steep gradient, precipitous slopes, huge boulders and rocks in the river valley, and large rapids. It flows through alpine, sub-alpine and temperate forests. Settlements occur along its lower course. The Indravati's catchment area includes the eastern slopes of the Kathmandu basin and extends to the Indravati – Sun Koshi water divide.
 
The Indravati meets the Sun Koshi at Dolalghat, located on the Arniko Highway that links Kathmandu with the Nepal-Tibet border.

Koshi River system
The Koshi River drains eastern Nepal. It is also known as Saptkoshi River because of the seven rivers joining in east-central Nepal to form this river. The main rivers forming the Koshi River system are Sun Koshi, Indravati, Tamma Koshi(or Tama Koshi), Bhote Koshi, Dudh Kosi, Arun and Tamur Rivers. The Saptkoshi River flows through the Chatra Gorge in a southerly direction into northern Bihar and joins the Ganges.

Quake
The April 2015 Nepal earthquake rupture began 80 km to the northwest of Kathmandu, and propagated eastward for about 130 km, rupturing the area directly located under the capital city of Nepal.  The rupture ends in the general zone of the western fringes of the Indravati river.

References

Rivers of Bagmati Province